Liquigas–Pata was an Italian UCI Professional Continental cycling team active from 1994 to 2001.

Notable riders
  (1997)
  (1994–1997)
  (1997–1998)
  (2000–2001)
  (1996)
  (1994)
  (1994–1999)
  (1998–2000)
  (1995–1998)
  (2000–2001)
  (1994)
  (1997–1998)
  (2000–2001)
  (1994–1995)
  (1996–1997)
  (1996–1997)

References

Defunct cycling teams based in Italy
Cycling teams based in Italy
Cycling teams established in 1994
Cycling teams disestablished in 2001